China Northern Airlines Flight 6901 (CJ6901) was a McDonnell Douglas MD-82 airliner from Beijing's Capital International Airport to Ürümqi Diwopu International Airport in Xinjiang, China. On November 13, 1993, it crashed on approach to Ürümqi Airport. Twelve of the 102 passengers and crew on board were killed. The accident has been attributed to pilot error.

Accident
While on final approach, the autopilot automatically disconnected. The Captain proceeded to reengage it, believing that it would still be in APP mode. When activated however, the autopilot went into VERT SPD mode with a setting of -800 feet per minute. The crew's failure to disconnect the autopilot and manually land the airplane contributed to the accident. Another factor was the crew's lack of proficiency in English. When the Ground Proximity Warning System (GPWS) issued an aural alarm, the captain asked his first officer what the words "Pull up" meant. The first officer replied that he did not know. Consequently, the pilots ignored the warnings and failed to correct their excessive rate of descent, causing the plane to strike power lines and a wall before coming down in a field.

Aircraft
The aircraft involved was a McDonnell Douglas MD-82 with the registration B-2141 and manufacturer's serial number 49849. It was delivered to China Northern Airlines in December 1991.

See also

 List of accidents and incidents involving commercial aircraft

References 

Airliner accidents and incidents caused by pilot error
Airliner accidents and incidents involving controlled flight into terrain
Aviation accidents and incidents in China
Aviation accidents and incidents in 1993
1993 disasters in China
20th century in Xinjiang
Accidents and incidents involving the McDonnell Douglas MD-82
China Northern Airlines accidents and incidents
November 1993 events in Asia